San Fernando station may refer to:
 San Fernando station (Pampanga), a defunct railway station in San Fernando City, Pampanga, Philippines
 San Fernando U station, a defunct PNR station in San Fernando City, La Union, Philippines (see references on talk page)
 San Fernando station (VTA), a light rail station in San Jose, California, United States
 Estación San Fernando, a railway station in Colchagua, Chile